Pinsetoppen ("The Whitsun Peak") is a mountain in Sørkapp Land at Spitsbergen, Svalbard. It has a height of 628 m.a.s.l. and is located on the mountain ridge Påskefjella, east of Samarinbreen. Neighbour peak is Påsketoppen further north.

References

Mountains of Spitsbergen